In organic chemistry, negative hyperconjugation is the donation of electron density from a filled π- or p-orbital to a neighboring σ*-orbital.  This phenomenon, a type of resonance, can stabilize the molecule or transition state.  It also causes an elongation of the σ-bond by adding electron density to its antibonding orbital.

Negative hyperconjugation is seldom observed, though it can be most commonly observed when the σ*-orbital is located on certain C–F or C–O bonds.

In negative hyperconjugation, the electron density flows in the opposite direction (from π- or p-orbital to empty σ*-orbital) than it does in the more common hyperconjugation (from a lone pair of electrons to an empty p-orbital).

See also
Conjugated system

References

Physical organic chemistry